Bernard Oliver may refer to:
 Bernard M. Oliver (1916–1995), scientist, founder of Hewlett-Packard laboratories
 Bernard Oliver, 17 year old victim of an unsolved murder in England from January 1967

See also
 Bernat Oliver (died 1348), Spanish bishop